Cabe Rawit Marketing Communication is an Indonesian marketing and advertising agency which was established in 1992 with the mission “To spice up the Indonesian advertising industry" and to remain a local agency, Cabe rawit focuses on the local market of Indonesia through research and communication.

History
Cabe Rawit Marketing Communications was established in 1992 and was founded by Narga S. Habib, Hamdan Omar and Inge Maskun and was located in Pondok Indah Ruko. In 1995 Hamdan Omar separated himself and later followed by Inge Maskun in 1997. They moved to their current location in Grha Morga in 2006.
Cabe Rawit Marketing Communications now belongs to PT Caberawit Pariwara and is owned by Narga S. Habib. Their subsidiaries include XCR, Studio Grafis and PT Pagelaran Expo Indonesia.

Awards
Between 1992 and 2003, Cabe Rawit has won 17 gold, 25 silver and 20 bronze in Citra Pariwara, the Indonesian advertising award event.  Their most memorable achievement was in 1995, when they won the golden medal for “Gesang”, a print advertisement for Yayasan Karya Cipta Indonesia (KCI), an organization to protect Indonesian copyright law.

In 2008 they have won Pertamina Creative Brief Award for their campaign of “Pasti Pas”, at that time, the state-linked petrol company was suffering from image problems.

Notable Clients
Some notable advertising campaign clients of Cabe Rawit are: Acer, Gudang Garam, Anker Beer, Yayasan Karya Cipta Indonesia (KCI) and Pertamina

References

External links
Cabe Rawit Website
Digital Marketing Agency
Strategic Communication

Advertising agencies of Indonesia
Marketing companies established in 1992
Indonesian companies established in 1992